Homalopteroides rupicola is a species of ray-finned fish in the genus Homalopteroides. It can be found in Myanmar.

References

Balitoridae
Fish described in 1929